Elizabeth Åsjord Sire (born 11 November 1995) is a Norwegian politician for the Conservative Party.

She serves as a deputy representative to Jonny Finstad in the Parliament of Norway from Nordland during the term 2017–2021. Hailing from Svolvær, she has been a central board member of the Norwegian Young Conservatives.

References

1995 births
Living people
People from Vågan
Deputy members of the Storting
Conservative Party (Norway) politicians
Nordland politicians
Norwegian women in politics
Women members of the Storting